Kumasi Cornerstone is a Ghanaian professional football club based in Kumasi, Ashanti. They are currently competing in the Ghana Division One League.

Honours
Ghanaian FA Cup: 2
1965, 1989

References

Football clubs in Ghana
1957 establishments in Ghana
Kumasi